Elections to Belfast City Council were held on 18 May 1977 on the same day as the other Northern Irish local government elections. The election used nine district electoral areas to elect a total of 51 councillors, most representing the more heavily populated north and west.

The UUP remained the largest party, and James Stewart became Lord Mayor. The narrow unionist majority of one on the council resulted in David Cook from Alliance becoming Lord Mayor in 1978, the first non-unionist Lord Mayor since 1898.

Election results

Note: "Votes" are the first preference votes.

Districts summary

|- class="unsortable" align="centre"
!rowspan=2 align="left"|Ward
! % 
!Cllrs
! % 
!Cllrs
! %
!Cllrs
! %
!Cllrs
! %
!Cllrs
! %
!Cllrs
! %
!Cllrs
!rowspan=2|TotalCllrs
|- class="unsortable" align="center"
!colspan=2 bgcolor="" | UUP
!colspan=2 bgcolor="" | Alliance
!colspan=2 bgcolor=""| SDLP
!colspan=2 bgcolor="" | DUP
!colspan=2 bgcolor="" | RC
!colspan=2 bgcolor="" | UPNI
!colspan=2 bgcolor="white"| Others
|-
|align="left"|Area A
|bgcolor="40BFF5"|29.2
|bgcolor="40BFF5"|2
|20.1
|2
|8.5
|1
|21.5
|2
|1.7
|0
|5.9
|0
|13.1
|0
|7
|-
|align="left"|Area B
|bgcolor="40BFF5"|33.0
|bgcolor="40BFF5"|3
|30.7
|2
|0.0
|0
|11.0
|1
|0.0
|0
|15.1
|1
|10.2
|0
|7
|-
|align="left"|Area C
|25.3
|2
|bgcolor="#F6CB2F"|33.8
|bgcolor="#F6CB2F"|3
|6.4
|0
|10.2
|0
|0.0
|0
|10.0
|1
|14.3
|0
|6
|-
|align="left"|Area D
|0.0
|0
|13.5
|1
|bgcolor="#99FF66"|69.2
|bgcolor="#99FF66"|4
|0.0
|0
|16.4
|1
|0.0
|0
|0.9
|0
|6
|-
|align="left"|Area E
|bgcolor="40BFF5"|35.1
|bgcolor="40BFF5"|2
|9.0
|1
|0.0
|0
|18.3
|1
|0.0
|0
|0.0
|0
|37.6
|2
|6
|-
|align="left"|Area F
|bgcolor="40BFF5"|31.2
|bgcolor="40BFF5"|2
|10.7
|1
|27.8
|1
|14.7
|1
|14.4
|1
|0.0
|0
|1.2
|0
|6
|-
|align="left"|Area G
|29.2
|2
|3.2
|1
|bgcolor="#99FF66"|29.9
|bgcolor="#99FF66"|1
|21.1
|1
|13.2
|1
|0.0
|0
|3.4
|0
|6
|-
|align="left"|Area H
|bgcolor="40BFF5"|29.8
|bgcolor="40BFF5"|2
|16.9
|2
|21.1
|1
|11.7
|1
|0.0
|0
|2.8
|0
|17.7
|1
|7
|-
|- class="unsortable" class="sortbottom" style="background:#C9C9C9"
|align="left"| Total
|26.8
|15
|18.6
|13
|18.6
|8
|13.3
|7
|4.7
|3
|5.0
|2
|13.0
|3
|51
|-
|}

District results

Area A

1973: 4 x UUP, 1 x Alliance, 1 x Vanguard, 1 x NILP
1977: 2 x UUP, 2 x DUP, 2 x Alliance, 1 x SDLP
1973-1977 Change: DUP (two seats), Alliance and SDLP gain from UUP (two seats), Vanguard and NILP

Area B

1973: 5 x UUP, 1 x Alliance, 1 x United Loyalist
1977: 3 x UUP, 2 x Alliance, 1 x UPNI, 1 x DUP
1973-1977 Change: Alliance, UPNI and DUP gain from UUP (two seats) and United Loyalist

Area C

1973: 4 x UUP, 2 x Alliance
1977: 3 x Alliance, 2 x UUP, 1 x UPNI
1973-1977 Change: Alliance and UPNI gain from UUP (two seats)

Area D

1973: 4 x SDLP, 1 x Republican Clubs, 1 x Alliance
1977: 4 x SDLP, 1 x Republican Clubs, 1 x Alliance
1973-1977 Change: No change

Area E

1973: 1 x UUP, 1 x DUP, 1 x NILP, 1 x Alliance, 1 x United Loyalist, 1 x Independent Unionist
1977: 2 x UUP, 1 x DUP, 1 x Alliance, 1 x Independent, 1 x Independent Unionist
1973-1977 Change: UUP and Independent gain from NILP and United Loyalist

Area F

1973: 3 x UUP, 1 x SDLP, 1 x DUP, 1 x Republican Clubs
1977: 2 x UUP, 1 x SDLP, 1 x DUP, 1 x Republican Clubs, 1 x Alliance
1973-1977 Change: Alliance gain from UUP

Area G

1973: 3 x UUP, 1 x SDLP, 1 x Alliance, 1 x Independent Unionist
1977: 2 x UUP, 1 x SDLP, 1 x DUP, 1 x Republican Clubs, 1 x Alliance
1973-1977 Change: DUP and Republican Clubs gain from UUP and Independent Unionist

Area H

1973: 5 x UUP, 1 x Alliance, 1 x SDLP
1977: 2 x UUP, 2 x Alliance, 1 x SDLP, 1 x DUP, 1 x Independent Unionist
1977-1981 Change: Alliance, DUP and Independent Unionist gain from UUP (three seats)

References

Belfast City Council elections
Belfast